Takashi Etō (born 5 February 1991) is a Japanese track and field athlete who competes in the high jump. He won the gold medal in the event at the Asian Athletics Championships in 2015. He represented Japan at the 2014 Asian Games and was national champion that year.

Career
Born in Mie Prefecture, he competed in the high jump as a teenager and began to make progress at national level in 2008, winning the national junior games and placing in the top three at the national junior championships. He gained his first international selection at the 2010 World Junior Championships in Athletics, but did not get past the qualifiers or improve upon his best.

Eto was beaten at national level by Hiromi Takahari at the 2012 Japan Championships and finished down in ninth place at that year's Japanese National Games. Eto and Takahari repeated their placings at the 2013 Japan Championships and he was again behind Takahari at the 2013 Asian Athletics Championships, coming seventh. This ranked him in the world top fifty in the seasonal rankings for the first time, and the fifth best Asian man.

He was also down at national level, comgin third at the National Games. He was again strong in the early season in 2015, twice equalling his best to win at the Shizuoka International and place third at the Golden Grand Prix (behind Bogdan Bondarenko and Zhang Guowei. He was the first Japanese man to win an Asian Championships high jump title since Shuji Ujino in 1985.

National titles
Japan Championships in Athletics
High jump: 2014
HJ: 2016 (2.29m, PB)

International competitions

References

External links

Living people
1991 births
Sportspeople from Mie Prefecture
Japanese male high jumpers
Olympic male high jumpers
Olympic athletes of Japan
Athletes (track and field) at the 2016 Summer Olympics
Athletes (track and field) at the 2020 Summer Olympics
Asian Games competitors for Japan
Athletes (track and field) at the 2014 Asian Games
Athletes (track and field) at the 2018 Asian Games
World Athletics Championships athletes for Japan
Asian Athletics Championships winners
Japan Championships in Athletics winners
University of Tsukuba alumni
20th-century Japanese people
21st-century Japanese people